Khalil-ur-Rahman Haqqani (born 1 January 1966), also known as Khalil-ur-Rehman Haqqani, Khalil al-Rahman Haqqani, Khaleel Haqqani and Khalil Ahmad Haqqani, is the current Afghan Minister of Refugees and a prominent leader of the Haqqani network.

Activities
During the Afghan War Haqqani engaged in international fundraising for the Taliban and supported Taliban operations in Afghanistan.  In 2002, Khalil deployed men under his charge to reinforce al-Qaida in Paktia Province, Afghanistan.  In 2009, Haqqani aided in the detention of enemy prisoners captured by the Haqqani network and the Taliban.  In 2010, Haqqani provided funding to the Taliban in Logar Province, Afghanistan.  Haqqani has carried out orders provided by his nephew, Sirajuddin Haqqani, a leader of the Haqqani network and who was designated a terrorist in March 2008 under Executive Order 13224.

On 9 February 2011, the United States Department of the Treasury under Executive Order 13224 designated Khalil Haqqani a Specially Designated Global Terrorist and offered a US$5 million bounty for him as one their most wanted terrorists. He is listed with the title of a hajji and addresses in Peshawar, Miram Shah, North Waziristan Agency in Pakistan and in Paktia, Afghanistan; while his date of birth has been variously given between 1958 and 1966.

On 9 February 2011 the United Nations pursuant to paragraph 2 of resolution 1904 (2009), Khalil Haqqani was added to the 1988 Sanctions List (TAi.150) for association with Al-Qaida, Osama bin Laden or the Taliban for “participating in the financing, planning, facilitating, preparing, or perpetrating of acts or activities by, in conjunction with, under the name of, on behalf of, or in support of” or “otherwise supporting acts or activities of” the Taliban.

The Haqqani network was founded by Khalil Haqqani's brother Jalaluddin Haqqani. In the mid-1990s they joined Mullah Mohammed Omar's Taliban regime.  The UN determined that Haqqani engages in fundraising activities on behalf of the Taliban and the Haqqani network and conducts international travel to obtain financial supporters. As of September 2009, Haqqani obtained financial support from the Arab states of the Persian Gulf and from sources in South Asia and East Asia.  In addition, Khalil has acted on behalf of Al-Qaida and is associated with their military operations including the deployment of reinforcements to Al-Qaida elements in Paktia Province, Afghanistan.

Government positions

In August 2021, after the fall of Kabul, Haqqani was placed in charge of security for the Kabul during the transition of power.

On 7 September 2021, Khalil Haqqani was appointed as Minister of Refugees for the reinstated Islamic Emirate of Afghanistan.

References

Further reading

External links
 The Haqqani Network (PDF), by Jeffrey A. Dressler, Institute for the Study of War

1966 births
Living people
Afghan Sunni Muslims
Haqqani network
Islamic terrorism in Afghanistan
Leaders of Islamic terror groups
Mujahideen members of the Soviet–Afghan War
Pashtun people
People from Paktia Province
Specially Designated Nationals and Blocked Persons List
Individuals designated as terrorists by the United States government
Afghan Islamists
Taliban leaders